Hopmann is a lunar impact crater that lies in the southern hemisphere on the Moon's far side. It is attached to the northern part of the large walled plain Poincaré. Less than one crater diameter to the north-northwest is the crater Garavito.

The outer rim of this crater has undergone some wear due to impact erosion. Still the inner walls possess some terrace structures along the southern edge. A small crater overlays the northern rim, and a pair of tiny craters line along the eastern edge.

The interior floor is relatively level and has a lower albedo than the surrounding surface, giving it a slightly dark appearance. There are some low ridges near the crater midpoint, and a double-ringed rim to the south-southeast of the center. A tiny craterlet to the northwest of the midpoint is surrounded by a small skirt of higher albedo material, giving it the appearance of a white patch.

See also 
 1985 Hopmann, minor planet

References

External links 

 ESA, "SMART-1’s view of Crater Hopmann: on the shoulder of a giant", May 3, 2006.

Impact craters on the Moon